Toby Okechukwu is an attorney who represents the Aninri, Awgu, and Oji River Federal Constituency in Enugu State in the House of Representatives of Nigeria.

Early life and education 
Hon Okechukwu was born on August 3rd, 1962, in Ugbo, Agwu Local Government Area of Enugu State. In 1976, completed his primary education at Community Primary School Ngene before proceeding to St. Vincent's Secondary School Agbogugu where he obtained a GCE in 1981.

Hon Okechukwu earned a Bachelor of Engineering in 1986 from the University of Calabar, a Master of Business Administration in 1991 from the Anambra State University of Technology, and a Bachelor of Laws (LLB) in 2000 from the University of Lagos. He continued to the Nigerian Law School at Victoria Island, Lagos, and received his bar admission in 2001.

Politics 
In 2011, Hon. Toby was elected to the Federal House of Representatives on the People's Democratic Party (PDP) platform to represent Aninri/Agwu/Oji-uzo.

Reference 

1962 births
Living people
Enugu State politicians
Candidates in the Nigerian general election, 2011
University of Calabar alumni
Chukwuemeka Odumegwu Ojukwu University alumni
University of Lagos alumni
Nigerian Law School alumni
21st-century Nigerian lawyers